Below are the squads for the 1996 AFF Championship hosted by Singapore, which took place between 1 and 15 September 1996. The players' listed age is their age on the tournament's opening day (1 September 1996).

Group A

Indonesia
Head coach: Danurwindo

Vietnam
Head coach:  Karl-Heinz Weigang

Myanmar
Head coach:  Ratomir Dujković

Laos
Head coach: Songphu Phongsa

Cambodia
Head coach:  Joachim Fickert

Group B

Thailand
Head coach: Thawatchai Sartjakul

Malaysia
Head coach: Wan Jamak Wan Hassan

Singapore
Head coach:  Barry Whitbread

Source:

Brunei Darussalam
Head coach: Dave Booth

{{nat fs 
player|no=17|pos=DF|name=Liew Chuan Fue|age=  |caps=N/A|club=Pahang FA|clubnat=Malaysia}}

Philippines
Head coach: Noel Casilao 
Note: Only partial squad known.

References

AFF Championship squads
squads